Branquinho is a diminutive form of Branco (meaning white in Portuguese and Galician). Branco may refer to:

Branquinho River, a river in the Brazilian state of Roraima
Branquinho, Brazilian birthday party candy, better known as Beijinho

People with the surname
Carlos de Liz-Texeira Branquinho (1902–1973), Portuguese diplomat
Veronique Branquinho (born 1973), Belgian fashion designer
Branquinho (footballer, born 1983), Brazilian football winger
Branquinho (footballer, born 1989), Brazilian football striker
Diogo Branquinho (born 1994), Portuguese handballer

See also
Branquinha, municipality of Alagoas state in Brazil
Brinquinho, a musical instrument from Portugal